Schmitt Gillenwater Kelly syndrome is a rare autosomal dominant congenital disorder consisting of radial hypoplasia, triphalangeal thumbs, hypospadias, and maxillary diastema.

References

External links 

Congenital disorders of musculoskeletal system
Autosomal dominant disorders
Genetic disorders with OMIM but no gene
Syndromes
Rare diseases